Morag Siller (1 November 1969 – 15 April 2016) was a Scottish actress, voice artist, and radio personality.

Siller died of breast cancer aged 46.

Biography

Early life and education
Siller was born in Edinburgh, Scotland, and was adopted at the age of three with her twin brother. While in school, she initially wanted to be a pianist but realised she would probably never be able to do it as a profession. Her attention then turned to becoming a policewoman but discovered she couldn’t apply as she was an inch shy of the department's height requirement of 5'4".

During her school years, she had appeared in plays, but only as an excuse to get out of classes. She attended the Edinburgh Acting School part-time, until she moved to London at the age of 18. She attended the Sylvia Young Theatre School followed by a postgraduate degree at the Royal Academy of Dramatic Art. While still in school, she landed a small part in the David Puttnam film Memphis Belle.

Acting career
Since 1992 Siller has performed in films, West End theatre, television, and radio. She has also appeared in numerous television commercials and pop videos, including Morrissey, Holly Johnson, Thompson Twins and Comic Relief. In 2000 she fulfilled an ambition by writing and co-directing a comedy sketch show, The Brushed Forward Arrangement.

She created semi-regular roles on television, such as Flora Kilwillie in Monarch of the Glen, Marilyn Dingle in Emmerdale and Leona in Casualty, (for which she won AOL's award for Best Dramatic Performance in a Television Series in 2000). She performed in two musicals, Les Misérables and Mamma Mia!. She also played Karen alongside Maureen Lipman and Anne Reid in the ITV comedy drama, Ladies of Letters.

Personal life
In May 2005 Morag married her long term partner, classical musician Tim Nicholson. The couple lived in Cheshire, England. She had no children.

Credits

Theatre

TV

Film

References

Content source

External links

Morag Siller's official website

1969 births
2016 deaths
Actresses from Edinburgh
Scottish film actresses
Scottish child actresses
Scottish television actresses
Scottish voice actresses
Scottish radio presenters
Scottish women radio presenters
Alumni of the Sylvia Young Theatre School
Alumni of RADA
Actresses from Manchester